is a railway station in the city of Sakata, Yamagata, Japan, operated by the East Japan Railway Company (JR East).

Lines
Sakata Station is served by the Uetsu Main Line. It is located 166.9 kilometers from the starting point of the Uetsu Main Line at Niitsu Station. The Rikuu West Line officially terminates at Amarume Station, but most trains continue on to terminate a Sakata Station, which is 55.2 kilometers from the eastern terminus of that line at Shinjō Station.

The following limited express services also stop at this station.
 Inaho ( - ) (some trains terminate at Sakata)

Discontinued
 Akebono ( - ) (overnight sleeping car service)
 Nihonkai ( - ) (overnight sleeping car service)

Station layout

Sakata Station has one side platform and one island platform connected by a footbridge. One portion of the side platform is cut to form a partial bay platform, allowing the two platforms to serve four tracks.
The station has a "Midori no Madoguchi" staffed ticket office and a "View Plaza" travel agency.

Platforms

History
The station opened on 24 December 1914. The station building was rebuilt in 1934 and again in 1960.

Passenger statistics
In fiscal 2018, the station was used by an average of 1159 passengers daily (boarding passengers only). The passenger figures for previous years are as shown below.

Surrounding area
 Port of Sakata
 Homma Museum of Art

See also
List of railway stations in Japan

References

External links

 Sakata Station information (JR East) 

Railway stations in Yamagata Prefecture
Rikuu West Line
Uetsu Main Line
Railway stations in Japan opened in 1914
Sakata, Yamagata